Rastislav Kružliak (born 11 July 1999) is a Slovak professional footballer who plays for Ružomberok as a forward. His cousin, Dominik Kružliak is playing for DAC Dunajská Streda.

Club career
Kružliak made his professional Fortuna Liga debut for Ružomberok in matchday one fixture of 2018–19 Fortuna liga season against iClinic Sereď on 21 July 2018. The match concluded as a goal-less tie. Kružliak came on the pitch in the 74th minute, replacing Tihomir Kostadinov. By the end of the season Kružliak had made 8 league appearances (plus 2 in Slovanft Cup), but always as a substituting player.

References

External links
 MFK Ružomberok official profile 
 Futbalnet profile 
 
 

1999 births
Living people
Slovak footballers
Association football forwards
MFK Ružomberok players
Slovak Super Liga players